Dumitru Hărădău (born 2 December 1951) is a Romanian former tennis player. He was a member of the Romanian Davis Cup team between 1972 and 1984 and played the Davis Cup finals in 1977 and 1980, and the Davis Cup semi-finals in 1978 and 1979. He won the Romanian National Tennis Championship (1973-77) and the Balkan Tennis Championship 5 times each. He was ranked twice No. 3 at the European Tennis Championships.  
He couched several tennis players, such as Horst Skoff (highest ranked 18 ATP) and Raluca Sandu (highest ranked 90 WTA).
Dumitru Haradau was ATP tournament director at Open Romania 1996-2006. 
He was the General Manager of the Romanian Tennis Federation 2005-08.

External links
 
 
 

Romanian male tennis players
Living people
1951 births
Place of birth missing (living people)
Universiade medalists in tennis
Universiade silver medalists for Romania
20th-century Romanian people
Presidents of the Romanian Tennis Federation